The women's keirin competition at the 2018 Asian Games was held on 28 August at the Jakarta International Velodrome.

Schedule
All times are Western Indonesia Time (UTC+07:00)

Results
Legend
REL — Relegated

First round

Heat 1

Heat 2

Heat 3

First round repechages

Heat 1

Heat 2

Second round

Heat 1

Heat 2

Finals

Final 7–12

Final 1–6

Final standing

References

Track Women Keirin